Pivka railway station is a significant railway station in Pivka, Slovenia. It is located on the main railway line between Ljubljana, Slovenia and Trieste, Italy

External links 
Official site of the Slovenian railways 

Railway stations in Slovenia